The men's double sculls competition at the 2019 World Rowing Championships took place at the Linz-Ottensheim regatta venue. A top-eleven finish ensured qualification for the Tokyo Olympics.

Schedule
The schedule was as follows:

All times are Central European Summer Time (UTC+2)

Results

Heats
The three fastest boats in each heat advanced directly to the quarterfinals. The remaining boats were sent to the repechages.

Heat 1

Heat 2

Heat 3

Heat 4

Heat 5

Heat 6

Repechages
The two fastest boats in each repechage advanced to the quarterfinals. The remaining boats were sent to the E/F semifinals.

Repechage 1

Repechage 2

Repechage 3

Quarterfinals
The three fastest boats in each quarter advanced to the A/B semifinals. The remaining boats were sent to the C/D semifinals.

Quarterfinal 1

Quarterfinal 2

Quarterfinal 3

Quarterfinal 4

Semifinals E/F
All but the slowest boat in each semi were sent to the E final. The slowest boats were sent to the F final.

Semifinal 1

Semifinal 2

Semifinals C/D
The three fastest boats in each semi advanced to the C final. The remaining boats were sent to the D final.

Semifinal 1

Semifinal 2

Semifinals A/B
The three fastest boats in each semi advanced to the A final. The remaining boats were sent to the B final.

Semifinal 1

Semifinal 2

Finals
The A final determined the rankings for places 1 to 6. Additional rankings were determined in the other finals.

Final F

Final E

Final D

Final C

Final B

Final A

References

2019 World Rowing Championships